The siege of Petra took place in 549 when the Eastern Roman (Byzantine) Empire, under Emperor Justinian I, besieged the strategic fortress of Petra in Lazica, held by the Sasanians. Petra's garrison took heavy casualties, but it stood firm until the arrival of a strong army under Mihr-Mihroe relieved the siege.

The siege

The Roman army was consisted of 7,000 regulars and 1,000 Tzani, and were under command of the magister militum per Armeniam Dagisthaeus. The Roman archery was very efficient during the siege; as they suppressed the defenders of the town, the sappers were able to approach the walls of Petra. However, mining operations were unsuccessful. According to Procopius, the small Sasanian garrison under "Mirranes" made a "display of valour such as no others known to us have made". At the end of the siege, 1,000 men of the 1,500-strong garrison had been killed and 350 men were wounded. The defenders had kept all of the corpses inside the fortification in order not to inform the attackers of their losses.

Dagisthaeus quickly withdrew before Mihr-Mihroe's army of cavalry and infantry arrived from Iberia. The latter reportedly taunted the Byzantine state because of its inability to defeat 150 men "without a wall", referring to the partially destroyed city wall. The Byzantines had destroyed a part of the wall, only to find that a building was behind it.

Subsequent conflicts

Lacking enough supplies for his army, Mihr-Mihroe hastily repaired the fallen portion of Petra's wall with linen bags filled with sands, garrisoned the fortress with 3,000 men, left 5,000 men under Fariburz in Colchis to supply the garrison, and himself headed for Persarmenia with the rest of the army.

The combined Byzantine-Lazi force, numbering 14,000, defeated Fariburz in a surprise attack, capturing the supplies brought from Iberia by Mihr-Mihroe for Petra. Another force under Chorianes was also defeated after the latter was killed in action. However, in the meantime, the Sasanians somehow managed to resupply the garrison at Petra. Dagisthaeus was later stripped of his commands due to his alleged poor leadership of the Byzantines in Petra, and was replaced by Bessas.

A year later, in 550, the Byzantines finally managed to retake the town from the Sasanians after a lengthy siege.

References

Sources
 
 

540s conflicts
Petra 549
Petra 549
Petra 549
6th century in the Byzantine Empire
Lazic War
6th century in Iran
540s in the Byzantine Empire
Sieges of Petra, Lazica